The 2018 American Athletic Conference men's soccer season was the 6th season of men's varsity soccer in the conference. The season began on August 24 and concluded on November 11, 2018.

The regular season was won by UCF, who finished conference play with a 5–1–1 record, and won on tiebreakers against SMU. SMU won the American Tournament, defeating UCF 5–4 in penalty kicks following a 1–1 draw in regulation and overtime. SMU earned the conference's automatic berth into the NCAA Tournament, while UCF and Connecticut received at-large berths into the tournament. In the NCAA Tournament, SMU lost in the first round to Oregon State. Connecticut beat rivals, Rhode Island, in the first round, before losing to Indiana in the second round. UCF was one of the 16 seeded teams (seeded 14th), allowing them to earn a bye into the second round. There, they lost in overtime to Lipscomb.

Following the season, Cal Jennings won the Offensive MVP award for the conference. Jacob Hauser-Ramsey of Connecticut won the Defensive MVP. Fellow UCF players, Louis Perez, Yannik Oettl, and Scott Calabrese won the AAC Midfielder, Goalkeeper, and Coach of the Year awards, respectively. Perez and Jennings were also named All-Americans by United Soccer Coaches.

Emil Cuello was the first AAC player to be drafted in the 2019 MLS SuperDraft, when he was selected by the LA Galaxy with the 19th overall pick in the first round of the draft.

Background

Head coaches

Preseason

Preseason poll 

The preseason poll will be released on August 14, 2018. UCF was picked to win the regular season.

Preseason national rankings 
Two of the programs were ranked in one of the five major preseason polls. CollegeSoccerNews.com and Hero Sports use a Top 30 ranking throughout the season, while United Soccer, Soccer America, and Top Drawer Soccer use a Top 25 ranking throughout the season.

Preseason All-Conference teams 

Preseason All-AAC Team

Regular season

Players of the Week

Rankings

United Soccer

Top Drawer Soccer

Postseason

AAC Tournament 

The 2018 Tournament will be held at the home ground of the regular season winner.

NCAA Tournament

Postseason awards and honors

Conference honors 

 denotes unanimous selection

Regional honors

National honors

American vs other conferences 

Regular Season

Post Season

MLS SuperDraft

Total picks by school

List of selections

Homegrown contracts

References

External links 
 American Athletic Conference Men's Soccer

 
2018 NCAA Division I men's soccer season